The Colfax Marathon (previously known as the Colorado Colfax Marathon) is an annual marathon foot-race held in Colorado, United States, since 2006.  Significant portions of the course follow Colfax Avenue.

History 

About 6,000 people took part in the inaugural event in 2006.

The 2011 Kaiser Permanente Colfax Marathon, Half Marathon and 5-person Marathon Relay were held on Sunday, May 15, 2011.

The 2020 in-person edition of the race was cancelled due to the coronavirus pandemic, with all registrants given the option of running the race virtually or transferring their entry to 2021 or 2022.

Similarly, the 2021 edition of the race, originally scheduled for May, was postponed to October due to the pandemic.

Course 

The initial course followed Colfax Avenue for almost the entire race.  It started in Aurora, headed west through Denver, and finished in Lakewood.

The course changed in 2008 to start and finish in Denver's City Park, with only portions of it on Colfax Avenue. The full marathon heads west to Lakewood and back; the half marathon east to Aurora and back.

Other races 

In addition to the main event, a half marathon, a relay and a 5K race also take place.

Colorado Colfax Kids Marathon 
The Colorado Colfax Kids Marathon was a race like the Colorado Colfax Marathon, established in 2006. The run was for Kindergarten to 8th grade students. It was a run that is only . The students ran the other  in training. The training lasted from February to early May. The race was usually planned to be held in the middle of May. The event was held at the Colorado Mills Mall. The students ran through a path in the parking lot around the mall area.

The race was replaced with the Kids Run America program before being cancelled altogether.

References

External links
Kaiser Permanente Colfax Marathon
Official 2007 Colorado Colfax Marathon Map
Official 2008 Colorado Colfax Marathon Course map
2008 Colfax Marathon Ready to Roll on May 18, 2008 with a Redesigned Course

Foot races in Colorado
Recurring sporting events established in 2006
Marathons in the United States
Sports competitions in Denver
Sports in Aurora, Colorado
2006 establishments in Colorado